Safdar Hosseini (born 1954) is an Iranian academic and politician, who has served in various cabinet posts. He was chairman of the National Development Fund of Iran from 2013 until 2016.

Early life and education
Hosseini was born in 1954. His family is from the province of Khuzestan. He holds a bachelor's degree in agriculture from Shiraz University and also, received a PhD in the same field from University of Saskatchewan of Canada.

Career
Hosseini was the minister of labour and social affairs in the cabinet of the president Mohammad Khatami from 2001 to 2004. Then he served as the minister of economy and finance affairs in the same cabinet. He was appointed in 2004, replacing Tahmasb Mazaheri in the post. Hosseini was replaced by Davoud Danesh-Jafari on 24 August 2005 when Mahmoud Ahmadinejad was elected president.

Personal life
His daughter, Fatemeh Hosseini, is the youngest member of Parliament of Iran.

Controversy
In 2016, while serving as the head of National Development Fund of Iran, it was leaked that Hosseini received more than $23,000 per month (dozens of times what the lowest-paid government workers earn). As a result of the scandal, Safdar Hosseini and his colleagues at the board of the Fund were forced to resign from the office.

References

1954 births
Finance ministers of Iran
Islamic Iran Participation Front politicians
Living people
People from Izeh
Shiraz University alumni
University of Saskatchewan alumni
Academic staff of the University of Tehran